Fanteakwa North is one of the constituencies represented in the Parliament of Ghana. It elects one Member of Parliament (MP) by the first past the post system of election. Fanteakwa North is located in the Fanteakwa District of the Eastern Region of Ghana.

Boundaries 
The constituency is located within the Fanteakwa District of the Eastern Region of Ghana.

Members of Parliament

See also 

 List of Ghana Parliament constituencies
 List of political parties in Ghana

References 

Parliamentary constituencies in the Eastern Region (Ghana)